Daniel Masterton (5 September 1954 – 5 January 2020) was a Scottish footballer, who played as a striker.

Masterton was from Muirkirk, Ayrshire. He began his career with Ayr United, before moving to Clyde, where he enjoyed the best spell of his career. He had a good scoring record at Clyde, scoring 67 goals in 125 games. He had a short spell at Queen of the South before retiring.

Masterton died on 5 January 2020.

References

External links

1954 births
2020 deaths
Scottish footballers
Ayr United F.C. players
Clyde F.C. players
Queen of the South F.C. players
Scottish Football League players
Footballers from Ayr
Association football forwards
Place of death missing